Ratchadamri station is a BTS skytrain station, on the Silom line in Pathum Wan District, Bangkok, Thailand. The station is on Ratchadamri Road between Ratchaprasong intersection and Lumphini Park, amid condominiums, office towers, hotels, and the Royal Bangkok Sports Club racetrack. There is a skyway from the station concourse to St Regis hotel.

Station layout

Bus connections
13: Khlong Toei–Huai Khwang
15: The Mall Thapra–Banglamphu
76: Samae Dam–Pratunam
77: CentralPlaza Rama III–Morchit 2 (operated with Private Joint)
505: Pakkret–Lumphini Park
514: Min Buri–Silom
A3: Don Mueang International Airport–Lumphini Park

References

BTS Skytrain stations